In the United Kingdom a Wildlife Liaison Officer is a specialist police officer tasked with combating wildlife crime, such as disturbance to native animals or the illegal import of animals or their by-products.

The role can be a full-time duty, or an adjunct to other duties.

See also
 National Wildlife Crime Unit

References 

Police positions in the United Kingdom